Marcel Wyss (born 25 June 1986) is a Swiss former road cyclist, who rode professionally between 2009 and 2016 for the , , ,  and  teams.

Career achievements

Major results

2004
 1st  National Junior Road Race Championships
2005
 3rd Freccia dei Vini
2007
 3rd Overall Mainfranken-Tour
 4th Overall Flèche du Sud
 5th Rund um den Henninger-Turm
2008
 1st  National Under-23 Time Trial Championships
 1st  National Under-23 Hill Climb Championships
 1st  Overall Flèche du Sud
1st Prologue
 4th Time trial, UCI Road World Under-23 Championships
 4th Overall Thüringen Rundfahrt der U23
 6th Overall Tour de l'Avenir
 9th Overall Tour Alsace
2010
 8th Overall Tour de Romandie
2011
 2nd National Time Trial Championships
2012
 1st Stage 2b (TTT) Settimana Internazionale di Coppi e Bartali
 8th Overall Tour of Austria
2013
 1st Tour de Berne
 2nd Cholet-Pays de Loire
 7th Overall Bayern-Rundfahrt
 7th Overall Volta a Portugal
 10th Overall Tour de Romandie
 10th Overall Tour of Britain
2014
 9th Overall Bayern-Rundfahrt
2015
 10th Overall Arctic Race of Norway
2016
 8th Overall Tour de l'Ain

Grand Tour general classification results timeline

References

External links

1986 births
Living people
Swiss male cyclists
People from Emmental District
Sportspeople from the canton of Bern